The Landaluce Stakes is a discontinued American Thoroughbred horse race which was held annually during the first part of July at Santa Anita Park in Arcadia, California. Created at Hollywood Park Racetrack in Inglewood, California in 1945 but after that track closed in 2013 the event was transferred to Santa Anita. Open to two-year-old filles, it was last contested over a distance of 5 ½ furlongs on dirt.

Inaugurated as the Hollywood Lassie Stakes, it was renamed in 1983 to honor Landaluce, the 1982 race winner and that year's American Champion Two-Year-Old Filly who died from a virus on December 11, 1982. Landaluce set the time record as well as the record for the biggest winning margin, opening up by 21 lengths over the rest of the field going down the stretch.

In 2004, the Landaluce Stakes lost its Grade III status. 

The final running of the Landaluce Stakes took place on July 2, 2017. Surrender Now won the race by eight lengths for owner Gary Hartunian's Rockingham Ranch.

Records
Speed record:
 1:08.00 @ 6 furlongs - Landaluce (1982)
 1:03.40 @ 5 ½ furlongs - Lynne's Orphan (1968)

Most wins by a jockey:
 5 - Johnny Longden (1945, 1947, 1948, 1956, 1957)
 5 - Bill Shoemaker (1959, 1962, 1967, 1972, 1985)
 5 - Eddie Delahoussaye (1983, 1984, 1989, 1993, 1996)

Most wins by a trainer:
 6 - D. Wayne Lukas (1978, 1982, 1984, 1985, 1987, 1994, 1999)

Most wins by an owner:
 4 - Jan, Mace & Samantha Siegel (1988, 1990, 1991, 1992)
 4 - Rex Ellsworth (1946, 1952, 1953, 1962)

Winners

External links
Landaluce winning the Hollywood Lassie

References

Discontinued horse races
Horse races in California
Santa Anita Park
Hollywood Park Racetrack
Flat horse races for two-year-old fillies
Previously graded stakes races in the United States
Recurring sporting events established in 1945
Recurring sporting events disestablished in 2018
1945 establishments in California
2018 disestablishments in California